Epitausa prona is a species of moth in the family Erebidae.

The MONA or Hodges number for Epitausa prona is 8581.

References

Further reading

 
 
 

Eulepidotinae
Articles created by Qbugbot
Moths described in 1880